The South African Railways Class 4 4-8-2 of 1911 was a steam locomotive from the pre-Union era in the Cape of Good Hope.

In 1911, the Cape Government Railways placed two steam locomotives with a  Mountain type wheel arrangement in service. They were renumbered and designated Class 4 when they were assimilated into the South African Railways a year later.

Manufacturer
The first  Mountain type locomotive of the Cape Government Railways (CGR) was designed as a heavy mixed traffic engine at the Salt River shops by H.M. Beatty, the Chief Locomotive Superintendent of the CGR from 1896 to 1910. Two locomotives were built by the North British Locomotive Company (NBL) and delivered in March 1911.

Characteristics
The locomotives were a further development of the two experimental locomotives which had been placed in service by the CGR in 1906, the CGR Class 9  (SAR Class Experimental 5) and the CGR Class 10  (SAR Class Experimental 6), both built by Kitson and Company.

The boiler was equipped with a combustion chamber which was carried forward  from the firebox into the boiler barrel, of which the diameter was increased at the hind course to suit.

They were numbered 850 and 851 in the CGR numbering sequence, but were not designated a classification. The two engines were not identical, no. 850 being equipped with the usual Ramsbottom safety valves while no. 851 had Cole’s muffled type Pop safety valves, both set to open at  boiler pressure. They were delivered with Type XJ tenders with a  coal and a  water capacity.

South African Railways

When the Union of South Africa was established on 31 May 1910, the three Colonial government railways (CGR, Natal Government Railways and Central South African Railways) were united under a single administration to control and administer the railways, ports and harbours of the Union. Although the South African Railways and Harbours came into existence in 1910, with Sir William Hoy appointed as its first General Manager, the actual classification and renum­bering of all the rolling stock of the three constituent railways were only implemented with effect from 1 January 1912.

In 1912, these two locomotives were renumbered to 1477 and 1478 and designated Class 4 on the SAR.

Service
Both locomotives were placed in service in the Karoo, working between Touws River and Beaufort West. In their later years they were stationed at Worcester, from where they were used extensively on and around the Cape Western system’s mainline, working pick-up goods trains to De Doorns in the Hex River valley and on the Mosselbaai line via Robertson.

They were withdrawn from service by 1938.

Illustration
The main picture shows SAR no. 1478 at Worcester, c. 1930, with Cole's Pop safety valves.

References

1260
1260
4-8-2 locomotives
2D1 locomotives
NBL locomotives
Cape gauge railway locomotives
Railway locomotives introduced in 1911
1911 in South Africa
Scrapped locomotives